Christie Lake is approximately  southwest of Perth, Ontario in the Tay Valley township. The watershed is characterized by thin soil and areas of exposed bedrock. The lake has a long, irregular shoreline, with rocky outcrops and steep cliffs throughout most of the northern and southern shoreline. There are 31 islands. The lake is the affords recreational activities of boating, fishing, kayaking and canoeing.

Things to do 

 Boating/Kayaking
 Christie Lake Sailing Club
 Fishing and Hunting
 Island Etiquette
 Swimming

References

Lakes of Lanark County